Donal Neil "Mike" O'Callaghan (September 10, 1929 March 5, 2004) was an American politician and educator who served as the 23rd Governor of Nevada from 1971 to 1979. He was a member of the Democratic Party.

Early life
Born in La Crosse, Wisconsin, O'Callaghan later moved to Sparta, where his family subsistence farmed. He lied about his age to join the U.S. Marine Corps, at the age of 16 and served from 1946 to 1948.

He attended Boise Junior College and joined the U.S. Air Force in 1950 and served as an intelligence operator in the Aleutian Islands. O'Callaghan was transferred to the U.S. Army in 1952 to see combat and lost part of his left leg after being hit by a mortar round during a battle in the Korean War. He was awarded the Silver Star and Bronze Star and returned to the United States.

O'Callaghan resumed his college studies at the University of Idaho in Moscow and completed his bachelor's and master's degree in education in 1956, then became a high school teacher and boxing coach in Nevada. He was U.S. Senator Harry Reid's history teacher at Basic High School in Henderson and later promoted Reid's political career. From 1961 to 1963, he was the chief probation officer and director of court services for Clark County.

Political career
O'Callaghan's political career began in 1963, when Governor Grant Sawyer appointed him to head the state's new department of health and welfare. In 1964, President Lyndon B. Johnson appointed O'Callaghan to be the regional director of the Office of Emergency Preparedness.

In 1966, O'Callaghan ran in the Democratic primary for lieutenant governor, but lost. In 1970, he received the Democratic gubernatorial nomination and won a surprising victory in the general election over his Republican opponent, Edward Fike. He proved to be an extremely popular governor and was re-elected in 1974 by a four-to-one margin, the greatest landslide in a gubernatorial election in state history.

The last Nevada governor before term limits, who was eligible for an elected third term, O'Callaghan chose not to run again in 1978. After he left office O'Callaghan became the executive editor of the Las Vegas Sun, a job he held until his death in 2004. He was also the publisher of the Henderson Home News and Boulder City News. In the 1990s, O'Callaghan monitored elections in Nicaragua and northern Iraq, and was a strong supporter of the nation of Israel.

Death
Mike O'Callaghan died on March 5, 2004, of a heart attack at the age of 74, after collapsing during the morning mass hours at the Saint Viator Catholic Church in Las Vegas, Nevada. He was pronounced dead at the Desert Springs Hospital in Paradise, Nevada. His widow Carolyn, a native of Twin Falls, Idaho, died seven months later on October 7, 2004, of complications from cardiac surgery, at the age of 68. They were married on October 25, 1954, in Twin Falls, Idaho and had five children; the former governor died one month before their 50th anniversary. Both are interred at the Southern Nevada Veterans Memorial Cemetery in Boulder City, Nevada.

Legacy
O'Callaghan's legacy as Nevada politician and philanthropist survives through three structures that bear his name. Mike O'Callaghan Middle School opened on the east side of Las Vegas in 1991. The Mike O'Callaghan Federal Hospital is located on Nellis Air Force Base northeast of Las Vegas. A bridge that is a part of the highway bypass around the Hoover Dam, spanning the Colorado River between Nevada and Arizona, bears O'Callaghan's name, as well as that of former NFL Arizona Cardinals player and U.S. Army veteran Pat Tillman. Tillman died in a friendly fire incident in Afghanistan. The Mike O'Callaghan–Pat Tillman Memorial Bridge was completed on October 14, 2010. Also in 2010, The O’Callaghan Resource Integrated Oncology Network (ORION) Cancer Foundation, a nonprofit charity that assists cancer patients in Nevada was established in honor of Mike and Carolyn O’Callaghan, both cancer survivors.

References

Citations

External links
 Nevada State Library & Archives – Mike O'Callaghan biography
 National Governor's Association: profile – Mike O'Callaghan
 University of Idaho Alumni Hall of Fame – 1971 inductees
 
 Las Vegas SUN obituary
 Las Vegas SUN remembrance
 Las Vegas CityLife remembrance
 Mike O'Callaghan Middle School web site

1929 births
2004 deaths
20th-century American politicians
American amputees
United States Army personnel of the Korean War
American politicians with disabilities
Burials at Southern Nevada Veterans Memorial Cemetery
Catholics from Nevada
Catholics from Wisconsin
Democratic Party governors of Nevada
Military personnel from Nevada
Military personnel from Wisconsin
Politicians from Carson City, Nevada
Politicians from La Crosse, Wisconsin
Politicians from Las Vegas
Recipients of the Silver Star
United States Air Force airmen
United States Marines
University of Idaho alumni